The Everhardt Ranch, located in southeast of Evergreen, Colorado, dates from 1867.  A portion of the ranch with three of its historic buildings was listed on the National Register of Historic Places in 1980.

It was deemed "significant for its associations with Johnny Everhardt and Gus and Marie Herzman, pioneer settlers in the Evergreen area, and for its architectural features which reflect the characteristic features of an early Colorado mountain ranch."

Its nomination was written in cooperation with Hiwan Homestead Museum.

References

Ranches in Colorado
National Register of Historic Places in Jefferson County, Colorado
Buildings and structures completed in 1867